is a Japanese actress best known from her work on SeraMyu. She is the longest performing actress in the Sailor Moon musicals, portraying many background characters, such as Sailor Theta and Sailor Lead Crow

Musicals
Sailor Moon S - Usagi Ai no Senshi e no Michi - Death Nightmare
Sailor Moon S - Henshin - Super Senshi e no Michi - Death Nightmare
Sailor Moon S - Henshin - Super Senshi e no Michi (Kaiteiban) - Death Nightmare
Shin / Henshin - Super Senshi e no Michi - Last Dracul Jokyoku - Death Nightmare
Sailor Moon SuperS - Yume Senshi - Ai - Eien ni... - Lemures
Sailor Moon SuperS - Yume Senshi - Ai - Eien ni... Saturn Fukkatsu Hen! - Lemures
Sailor Moon SuperS - Bishoujo Senshi Sailor Moon SuperS Special Musical Show - Lemures
Sailor Moon Sailor Stars (musical) - Shadow Bug
Sailor Moon Sailor Stars (Kaiteiban) - Sailor Theta
Eien Densetsu - Sailor Theta
Eien Densetsu (Kaiteiban) - The Final First Stage - Sailor Theta
Shin Densetsu Kourin  - Dark Moon
Kaguya Shima Densetsu - Dark Menorah
Kaguya Shima Densetsu (Kaiteiban) Natsuyasumi! Houseki Tankentai - Dark Menorah
Kessen / Transylvania no Mori - Shin Toujou! Chibi Moon wo Mamoru Senshi-tachi - Demon Lilit
Kessen / Transylvania no Mori (Kaiteiban) - Saikyou no Kataki Dark Cain no Nazo - Demon Lilit
Chou Wakusei Death Vulcan no Fuuin - Roi Malkuth
Tanjou! Ankoku no Princess Black Lady - Calaveras
Tanjou! Ankoku no Princess Black Lady (Kaiteiban) - Wakusei Nemesis no Nazo - Calaveras
10th Anniversary Festival - Ai no Sanctuary - Dark Maya
Mugen Gakuen - Mistress Labyrinth - Centi
Mugen Gakuen - Mistress Labyrinth (Kaiteiban) - Centi
Starlights - Ryuusei Densetsu - Sailor Lead Crow
Kakyuu-Ouhi Kourin - The Second Stage Final - Sailor Lead Crow
Shin Kaguya Shima Densetsu - Selkie
Shin Kaguya Shima Densetsu (Kaiteiban) - Marinamoon Final - Selkie

External links
Endou's SeraMyu Profile

Japanese actresses
Living people
1973 births